Prudhomme or Prud'homme, may refer to:

 Prudhomme (surname), a surname of French origin. The surname derives from the Old French prud'homme, meaning a wise, honest or sensible man.
 Prud'homme, Saskatchewan, a Canadian village
 Prudhomme Lake Provincial Park, in British Columbia, Canada
 Fort Prudhomme, a French fortification in Tennessee

See also
 Perdomo (disambiguation), Spanish variant
 Prod'homme, a French automobile manufactured 1907 to 1908